The 2015 Indy Grand Prix of Louisiana was the second round of the 2015 IndyCar Series season, and the race took place on April 12 in New Orleans, Louisiana, at the NOLA Motorsports Park. The race was won by James Hinchcliffe for Schmidt Peterson Motorsports. Hélio Castroneves finished second for Team Penske. James Jakes finished third ahead of Simona de Silvestro, and Juan Pablo Montoya. The top finishing rookie in the race was Gabby Chaves, in 15th position.

Report

Qualifying
Qualifying was cancelled as rain brought an early end to proceedings. The grid was set by entrant points standings from the previous race; the Grand Prix of St. Petersburg.

Race results 

Notes
 Points include 1 point for leading at least 1 lap during a race, an additional 2 points for leading the most race laps, and 1 point for Pole Position.

Race was scheduled for 75 laps but shortened due to time limit.

Championship standings after the race

Drivers' Championship standings

 Note: Only the top five positions are included.

References

 Lap Report - Verizon IndyCar Series, April 12, 2015

Motorsport competitions in New Orleans
Motorsports
Indy Grand Prix of Louisiana
Indy Grand Prix of Louisiana